Worton, Oxfordshire may refer to:
Worton (civil parish), Oxfordshire, containing the villages of Nether Worton and Over Worton,
Worton (hamlet), Oxfordshire, in Cassington civil parish